The 2016–17 Club Atlético Boca Juniors season is the 88th consecutive Primera División season for the senior squad. During the season, Boca Juniors will take part in the Primera División, Copa Argentina and in the Semifinals of the Copa Libertadores.

Season overview

June
In the first days of June, 3 players arrived to the club: Fernando Zuqui, from Godoy Cruz, in the transfer it was included money for Guillermo Pol Fernández; Darío Benedetto, from Club América; and Walter Bou, who was loaned from Gimnasia y Esgrima (LP). Also, Lisandro Magallán and Gonzalo Castellani returned from their loans in Defensa y Justicia and Lanús. Additionally, Alexis Rolín left the club. After 7 years and more than 150 games in the club, Cristian Erbes left Boca to play in Mexican team Veracruz. The season started with a 4–0 win over Güemes in the Round of 64 of the Copa Argentina.

July
Santiago Vergini signed with Boca despite that the medical check wasn't good. Nicolas Benegas is loaned to Quilmes. Boca lost their first match of Copa Libertadores, in the Semifinals, 2–1 against Independiente del Valle; and in the second leg, Boca lost again, in an incredible match 3-2 and it was eliminated in the Semifinals. Fernando Tobio returned to Palmeiras. Andrés Chávez is loaned to São Paulo. Daniel Díaz is transferred to Getafe CF. Nicolás Lodeiro is transferred to Seattle Sounders FC. César Meli signed for Sporting CP on a one-year loan. Talleres (C) made use of the option to purchase Juan Cruz Komar permanently.

August
Sebastián Palacios is transferred to Talleres (C). Also, 4 more players arrived to the club: Sebastián Pérez, from Atlético Nacional; Axel Werner, who was loaned from Atlético Madrid; Ricardo Centurión, who was loaned from São Paulo and Fernando Tobio, who was loaned again from Palmeiras. After 5 years and more than 200 games, Agustín Orión left the club to play in Racing Club. On August 23 Boca won 2–1 over Santamarina in the Round of 32 of the Copa Argentina. Wílmar Barrios and Nazareno Solís are transferred from Deportes Tolima and Talleres (C). The new players were publicly introduced in the last days of August. At the start of the Primera División tournament Boca played against Lanús losing 1–0. Franco Cristaldo is loaned to Rayo Vallecano.

September
Leandro Marín is loaned to Arsenal. Nicolás Colazo is loaned to Australian team Melbourne City. The first match of September was a 3–0 victory over Belgrano. After that a 1–1 draw against Godoy Cruz and a 4–1 win vs Quilmes with a hat-trick of Darío Benedetto. Boca advanced to the Quarterfinals of Copa Argentina after the victory over Lanús in the penalty shoot-out.

October
The month started with a 1–1 draw against Tigre and a 2–0 victory over Sarmiento. Gonzalo Castellani is loaned to Defensa y Justicia. Boca played in Tucumán against Atlético Tucumán achieving a 2–2 draw. After that a 4–0 win over Temperley.

November
Boca lost against Rosario Central in the Quarterfinals of Copa Argentina; Boca will not play any CONMEBOL tournaments in 2017. Boca won the first match away, 3–0 in La Plata against Gimnasia y Esgrima (LP). On November 11 in Spain, Boca won the Antonio Puerta Trophy 4–3 against Sevilla. D.C. United acquires Luciano Acosta on a permanent transfer after the expiration of his one-year loan. Boca couldn't won against Rosario Central in the local tournament, it was a 1–1 draw. Boca won the derby against San Lorenzo, after several months Fernando Gago returned to the first team.

December
In the first match of December, Boca got a great win 4–2 over Racing Club; and 4–2 against River Plate in the Superclásico. In the last match of 2016 Boca won 4–1 against Colón. After a lot of rumors finally was confirmed that the last idol of the club, Carlos Tevez is transferred to Shanghai Shenhua of China.

January
Adrián Cubas signed for Pescara on a six-month loan. After a 2–0 victory over Estudiantes (LP) in Mar del Plata, and a 2–2 draw against San Lorenzo Boca was crowned championship of the Copa de Oro. On the last friendly Superclasico, River Plate defeated Boca 2–0, the match was played in Mar del Plata. César Meli is transferred to Racing Club.

February
On February 2 Boca lost 5–3 in penalties after a 1–1 draw in a friendly against Chivas de Guadalajara in Jalisco. Oscar Benítez is loaned to Boca from Benfica on an 18-month loan and the goalkeeper Agustín Rossi is transferred from Estudiantes (LP). On February 11 Boca lost 3–1 against Aldosivi. Federico Carrizo is transferred to Rosario Central. The last friendly of the summer was a 2–1 victory over Colón.

March
In the long-awaited return of the tournament Boca beat Banfield 2–0. And then suffered the first defeat in La Bombonera against Talleres (C). After that loss Boca won a difficult game 2–1 in San Juan against San Martín.

April
In the first game of April Boca win 1–0 against Defensa y Justicia. And then, a 3–1 win over Vélez Sarsfield, keeping Boca in the first place of the table. But a 1–1 draw against Patronato and a 0–0 draw against Atlético de Rafaela made Boca lose 4 important points. In the last match of April Boca won 3–0 over Arsenal.

May
Boca started May with a 0–0 draw against Estudiantes (LP). In the second Superclasico Boca played very badly and lost 3–1; but then Boca won 1–0 over Newell's Old Boys and drew 1–1 against Huracán.

June
Boca, showing great football won 3-0 the derbi over Independiente, and after that a 4–0 win over Aldosivi. On June 20, San Lorenzo won 1–0 over Banfield, the only team with chances to reach Boca at the top, so that Boca became the champion of 2016–17 Primera División. In the last away match Boca drew 2–2 against Olimpo. In the last match of the tournament Boca won 2–1 over Unión. With 21 goals Darío Benedetto finished as the tournament goalscorer.

Current squad

Last updated on June 25, 2017

Transfers

Winter

Summer

Pre-season and friendlies

Winter

Summer

Competitions

Overall

1: There is a one-month break between the quarterfinals and semifinals due to the Copa América Centenario held in June, so the Second Stage, Round of 16 and Quarterfinals belong to the previous season.

Overview

Primera División

League table

Relegation table

Results summary

Results by round

Matches

Copa Argentina

Round of 64

Round of 32

Round of 16

Quarterfinals

Copa Libertadores

Final Stages

Semifinals

Team statistics

Season Appearances and goals

Last updated on June 25, 2017

|-
! colspan="12" style="background:#dcdcdc; text-align:center"| Goalkeepers

|-
! colspan="12" style="background:#dcdcdc; text-align:center"| Defenders

|-
! colspan="12" style="background:#dcdcdc; text-align:center"| Midfielders

|-
! colspan="12" style="background:#dcdcdc; text-align:center"| Forwards

|-
! colspan="14" style="background:#dcdcdc; text-align:center"| Players away from the club on loan:

|-
! colspan="14" style="background:#dcdcdc; text-align:center"| Players transferred out during the season:

|}

Top scorers
Last updated on June 25, 2017

Clean sheets
Last updated on June 25, 2017

Disciplinary record
Last updated on June 25, 2017

References

External links
 Club Atlético Boca Juniors official web site 

Club Atlético Boca Juniors seasons
Boca Juniors